Jethro Tull are  a British rock band formed in Luton, England, in 1967. Initially playing blues rock and jazz fusion, the band soon incorporated elements of English folk, hard rock, and classical music, forging a signature progressive rock sound. The group’s bandleader, founder, primary composer, and only constant member is Ian Anderson, a multi-instrumentalist who mainly plays flute and acoustic guitar, and is also the lead vocalist. The group has featured a succession of musicians throughout the decades, including significant contributors such as electric guitarist Martin Barre (the longest serving member besides Anderson), keyboardists John Evan, Dee Palmer, Peter-John Vettese, and Andrew Giddings, drummers Clive Bunker, Barrie "Barriemore" Barlow, and Doane Perry, and bassists Glenn Cornick, Jeffrey Hammond, John Glascock, Dave Pegg, and Jonathan Noyce.

The band achieved moderate recognition in the London club scene and released their debut album, This Was, in 1968. After a lineup change which saw original guitarist Mick Abrahams replaced by Martin Barre, the band released their folk-tinged second album Stand Up in 1969. Stand Up saw the band achieve their first commercial success, reaching No. 1 in the UK, which was followed by regular tours of the UK and the US. The musical style shifted in the direction of progressive rock with the albums Aqualung (1971), Thick as a Brick (1972), and A Passion Play (1973), and shifted again to contemporary folk rock with Songs from the Wood (1977), Heavy Horses (1978), and Stormwatch (1979). In the early 1980s, the band underwent a major lineup change and shifted towards electronic rock, with the albums A (1980), The Broadsword and the Beast (1982), and Under Wraps (1984). The band won their sole Grammy Award for the 1987 album Crest of a Knave, which saw them returning to a hard rock style. Jethro Tull have sold an estimated 60 million albums worldwide, with 11 gold and five platinum albums. They have been described by Rolling Stone as "one of the most commercially successful and eccentric progressive rock bands."

The last works as a group to contain new material prior to their hiatus were J-Tull Dot Com (1999) and a Christmas album in 2003, though the band continued to tour until 2011. Both Anderson and Barre have continued to record and tour as solo artists. Anderson said in 2014 that Jethro Tull "came more or less to an end." The current group—now billed as "Ian Anderson and the Jethro Tull band"—includes musicians who were part of Jethro Tull during the last years of its initial run as well as newer musicians associated with Anderson's solo band, without Barre's involvement. Jethro Tull released The Zealot Gene in 2022 following a gap of 19 years, and are currently working on a 23rd album, titled RökFlöte.

History

Origins

Ian Anderson, Jeffrey Hammond and John Evan (originally Evans), who would become members of Jethro Tull, attended grammar school together in Blackpool. Anderson was born in Dunfermline, Scotland and grew up in Edinburgh before moving to Blackpool in January 1960. Evans had become a fan of the Beatles after seeing them play "Love Me Do" on Granada Television's Scene at 6:30. Though he was an accomplished pianist, he decided to take up the drums, as it was an instrument featured in the Beatles' line-up. Anderson had acquired a Spanish guitar and taught himself how to play it, and the pair decided to form a band. The pair recruited Hammond on bass, who brought along his collection of blues records to listen to.

The group initially played as a three piece at local clubs and venues, before Evans became influenced by Georgie Fame and the Animals and switched to organ, recruiting drummer Barrie Barlow and guitarist Mike Stephens from local band the Atlantics. By 1964 the band had recruited guitarist Chris Riley and developed into a six-piece blue-eyed soul band called the John Evan Band (later the John Evan Smash). Evans had shortened his surname to "Evan" at the insistence of Hammond, who thought it sounded better and more unusual. The group recruited Johnny Taylor as a booking agent and played gigs further afield around northwest England, playing a mixture of blues and Motown covers. Hammond subsequently quit the band to go to art school. He was briefly replaced by Derek Ward, then by Glenn Cornick. Riley also quit and was replaced by Neil Smith. The group recorded three songs at Regent Sound Studios in Denmark Street, London in April 1967, and appeared at The Marquee club in June.

In November 1967 the band moved from the north of England, subsequently basing themselves in Luton, Bedfordshire, 43 miles from central London. They signed a management deal with Terry Ellis and Chris Wright, and replaced Smith with guitarist Mick Abrahams. They quickly realised that supporting a 6-piece band was financially impractical and disbanded. Anderson, Abrahams, and Cornick decided to stay together, recruiting Abrahams's friend Clive Bunker on drums, and they became a British blues band. Cornick recalled that although Evan left, the band said he was welcome to rejoin at a later date. Anderson shared a ground-floor flat with Cornick in a large house at the top of Studley Road in Luton, and worked as a cleaner for the Luton Ritz Cinema to pay the rent. According to Cornick, "we were so poor that we would share one can of stew or soup between us each evening."

Early years (1967–1968)

At first the new band had trouble getting repeat bookings and they took to changing their name frequently to continue playing the London club circuit. A few of the names include Navy Blue, Ian Henderson's Bag o' Nails, and Candy Coloured Rain. Anderson recalled looking at a poster at a club and concluding that the band name he did not recognise was his. Band names were often supplied by their booking agent's staff. One of whom, a history enthusiast, eventually christened them Jethro Tull, after the 18th-century agriculturist. The name stuck because they happened to be using it the first time a club manager liked their show enough to invite them to return. They recorded a session with producer Derek Lawrence, which resulted in the single "Sunshine Day". The B-side "Aeroplane" was an old John Evan Band track with the saxophones mixed out. It was released in February 1968 on MGM Records, miscredited to "Jethro Toe". Anderson has since queried the misnomer as a possible attempt by the producer to avoid paying royalties to the band. The more common version, with the name spelled correctly, is actually a counterfeit made in New York. Anderson later met Hammond while in London and the two renewed their friendship, while Anderson moved into a bedsit in Chelsea with Evan. Hammond became the subject of several songs, beginning with their next single, "A Song for Jeffrey".

Anderson possessed a large overcoat, his father having given it to him with the words "You'd better take this. It's going to be a cold winter." This overcoat and, slightly later on, the flute, became part of his early stage image. It was around this time that Anderson purchased a flute after becoming frustrated with his inability to play guitar as well as Abrahams or Cream guitarist Eric Clapton, and because their managers thought he should remain a rhythm guitarist, with Abrahams becoming the front man.

I didn't want to be just another third-rate guitar player who sounded like a plethora of other third-rate guitar players. I wanted to do something that was a bit more idiosyncratic, hence the switch to another instrument. When Jethro Tull began, I think I'd been playing the flute for about two weeks. It was a quick learning curve ... literally every night I walked onstage was a flute lesson.

The group's first major break occurred at the National Jazz and Blues Festival at Sunbury-on-Thames in August 1968, where the band drew a rapturous reception and positive reviews in the music press. The band have since claimed that the success at Sunbury was a result of their persistent touring, which had generated a grassroots following who had all assembled at the festival and encouraged the rest of the audience. Cornick recalled, "from that moment on, we were a big band".

The group recorded their first album, This Was, between June and August 1968, and it was released in October, reaching number 10. In addition to original material, the album included the traditional "Cat's Squirrel", which highlighted Abrahams's blues rock style, while the Rahsaan Roland Kirk-penned jazz piece "Serenade to a Cuckoo" gave Anderson a showcase for his growing talents on the flute. The overall sound of the group at this time was described in the Record Mirror by Anderson in 1968 as "a sort of progressive blues with a bit of jazz."

Following the album's release, Abrahams left the band in December to form his own group, Blodwyn Pig. There were a number of reasons given for his departure. Abrahams had heard that Ellis wanted Anderson to be the frontman and group leader, at his expense, and realised he was unlikely to have the majority share in songwriting. Other reasons given were that Abrahams was a blues purist while Anderson wanted to branch out into other forms of music, and that Abrahams was unwilling to travel internationally or play more than three nights a week. Abrahams himself described his reasons more succinctly: "I was fed up with all the nonsense, and I wanted to form a band like Blodwyn Pig."

The group tried several replacements for Abrahams. The first was David O'List, who had recently left the Nice. After a week's rehearsal, O'List did not show up and lost contact with the group. The next choice was Mick Taylor, who turned the group down because he felt his current gig with John Mayall's Bluesbreakers was a better deal. Following this, they approached Tony Iommi, guitarist for Earth (soon to be renamed Black Sabbath). Iommi had impressed Tull when Earth opened for them at a show in Birmingham. He briefly joined Jethro Tull, however, feeling closer to his old band, he quit after a few weeks and returned to Birmingham to rejoin Earth. At Anderson's request, Iommi agreed to stand-in with Jethro Tull in The Rolling Stones Rock and Roll Circus on 11 December 1968. The group performed "A Song for Jeffrey", but only Anderson's singing and flute were live; the rest was mimed to the studio track, which featured Abraham's guitar playing.

The next choice was Martin Barre, who had seen the band perform at Sunbury, and had been tried out at the same audition as Iommi. Barre arranged a second audition with Anderson, who showed him some new songs that were in a different style from the blues they had been recording. Anderson was impressed by Barre's technique, and offered him the job as the new guitarist. Barre played his first gig with Jethro Tull on 30 December 1968 at the Winter Gardens, Penzance.

Stand Up through Aqualung (1969–1971)
After Barre joined, the group did a few shows supporting Jimi Hendrix in Scandinavia, then set out on an extensive tour of the US, supporting Led Zeppelin and Vanilla Fudge. Having attracted a substantial live following, Ellis and Wright asked Anderson, who had become the dominant songwriter, to write a hit single. The result was "Living in the Past", which reached No. 3 in May on the UK singles chart and No. 11 in the US, and resulted in an appearance on Top of the Pops. Although other so-called "serious" groups actively resisted issuing stand-alone singles at the time, Jethro Tull felt a hit single was a positive move for the group, if not their priority.

The next album was Stand Up, recorded during April–May and August 1969. It was released in September, and quickly reached No. 1 in the UK, the only album by the group to do so. Anderson had now established himself as the group's leader and songwriter, and wrote all of the material, aside from his jazzy rearrangement of J. S. Bach's "Bourrée in E minor BWV 996 (fifth movement)". The album cover unfolded to a photo insert of the band attached to the covers like a pop-up book.

Immediately after releasing Stand Up, the group set off on their first headlining tour in the US, including an appearance at the Newport Jazz Festival. Barre recalled, "It was really the turning point for Jethro Tull—for everything that we were to become and everything we were to inspire in others." The band was invited to play in the Woodstock Festival, but Anderson declined, being afraid that the band would be permanently associated with the hippie movement and moulded into one type of sound.

On 29 January 1970 the band appeared on BBC's Top of the Pops again, performing "Witch's Promise". Evan rejoined the band in early 1970. He had stayed in London since the John Evan Band broke up, living with Anderson, and began studying music at the University of London. The pair did not see much of each other because of Jethro Tull's increasing workload, and Evan was reluctant to rejoin because of his studies, which gave him access to a free studio. He played as a session musician on the next album, Benefit (1970), following which Anderson said they needed somebody to play the keyboard parts on tour. His tutor eventually persuaded him that it was a good idea, and Evan formally joined. The album reached No. 4 in the UK and No. 11 in the US, and allowed the group to sell out 20,000-seat arenas, establishing themselves as a premier live act. In August, the band played to one of their largest audiences at the 1970 Isle of Wight festival.

The Isle of Wight appearance was followed by another US tour, during which Jethro Tull became only the second rock band after The Beatles to perform at Carnegie Hall in New York City. Cornick left the band at the tour's conclusion. He was keen to socialise on tour, while the other members became more reclusive and introverted. Cornick said he was fired by Anderson, while the band's official website said he was "invited to leave" by Ellis, but given full support and encouragement to form his own band. Cornick subsequently formed Wild Turkey, a band which he revived for Jethro Tull fan conventions decades later. He died in August 2014.

Anderson invited Jeffrey Hammond to replace Cornick, buying a new bass for this purpose. However, Hammond had not played an instrument since going to art school shortly after his time in the John Evan Band, and was chosen more for his social compatibility with the other band members than for his musical skills. This line-up recorded Aqualung in late 1970, releasing it in 1971. The album was split into two sides, subtitled Aqualung and My God, and featured Anderson's opinions about organised religion. Recording the album was problematic because of technical issues in the studio and Hammond's rusty musical skills. On "Locomotive Breath", Anderson recorded the backing track on his own, singing along to a hi-hat accompaniment, which the rest of the band recorded on top of later. Despite Anderson's concerns that it may have been "too radical" compared with the band's previous albums, Aqualung was the first Jethro Tull album to reach the top ten in the US, peaking at No. 7. It sold over one million copies, earning it a gold disc by the RIAA in July 1971.

Progressive rock (1971–1976)
Because of the heavy touring schedule and his wish to spend more time with his family, drummer Bunker quit the group in May 1971, and was replaced by Barrie Barlow, whom Anderson rechristened "Barriemore". Barlow had first recorded with the band for the five-track EP Life Is a Long Song. Except for Barre, the line-up of Jethro Tull now consisted entirely of former John Evan Band members from Blackpool. In July 1971, the band wished to avoid the increasingly strict UK tax laws in order to keep more of their income. They became tax exiles, and relocated to Switzerland. The move put strain on Anderson's marriage to his first wife, which lasted for another year before they divorced.

Anderson had become annoyed with music critics calling Aqualung a concept album, which he did not intend it to be. In 2005, Anderson later insisted, "I always said at the time, this is not a concept album. It's an album of varied songs...in which three or four are kind of the keynote pieces for the album, but it doesn't make it a concept album."

In response to the many critics who called Aqualung a concept album, Anderson decided to "come up with something that really is the mother of all concept albums". He had become influenced by Monty Python's humour, and wrote a suite that combined complex musical ideas with a sense of humour to make fun of the band, its audience and its critics. The album, released in 1972, became Thick as a Brick, which was co-credited to a fictional schoolboy, Gerald Bostock. It consisted of a single track running over 43 minutes, split over two sides, which was uncommon for rock albums. Although the finished album was a continuous piece of music, it was written and recorded in stages, with the whole band helping with the arrangements. Thick as a Brick was the first Tull album to reach number one on the (US) Billboard Pop Albums chart with the following year's A Passion Play being the only other to do so.

1972 also saw the release of Living in the Past, a double-album compilation of remixed singles, B-sides and outtakes (including the entirety of the Life Is a Long Song EP, which closes the album), with the third side recorded live in 1970 at New York's Carnegie Hall on 4 November 1970. The album was successful, as it allowed new fans to catch up with early singles, particularly in the US where they had not been popular on initial release. New Musical Express called Jethro Tull one of "Britain's most important and successful 2nd generation progressive bands".

In 1973, the band attempted to produce a double album at France's Château d'Hérouville studios, something the Rolling Stones and Elton John among others were doing at the time, but supposedly they were unhappy with the quality of the recording studio and abandoned the effort, subsequently mocking the studio as the "Chateau d'Isaster". They returned to England, and Anderson did some rewriting before Jethro Tull quickly recorded and released A Passion Play (1973), another single-track concept album, with allegorical lyrics focusing on the afterlife. Like Thick as a Brick, A Passion Play contained instrumentation rather uncommon in rock music. The album also featured an eccentric interlude, "The Story of the Hare Who Lost His Spectacles", which was co-written (along with Anderson and Evan) and narrated by bassist Hammond.  A Passion Play sold well but received generally poor reviews, including a particularly damning review of its live performance by Chris Welch of Melody Maker. Anderson angrily shut himself away from all communication with the press in the wake of the negative critical response to A Passion Play.

Even as the band's popularity with critics began to wane around this time, their popularity with the public remained strong, as evidenced by high sales of their follow-up album, 1974's War Child. Originally intended to be a companion piece for a film, it reached number two on the US Billboard charts and received some critical acclaim, and produced the radio mainstays "Bungle in the Jungle" (#12 on the US singles chart) and "Skating Away on the Thin Ice of the New Day". It also included a short acoustic song, "Only Solitaire", widely thought to be aimed at L.A. Times rock music critic Robert Hilburn, who had written a harsh review of the A Passion Play concerts at the Santa Monica Civic Auditorium. However, Anderson said the song was written before Hilburn's review and was aimed at music critics in general. The War Child tour also featured a female string quartet playing along with the group on the new material.

In 1975, the band released Minstrel in the Gallery, an album which resembled Aqualung (1971) in that it contrasted softer, acoustic-guitar-based pieces with lengthier, more bombastic works headlined by Barre's electric guitar. Written and recorded during Anderson's divorce from his first wife Jennie Franks, the album is characterised by a markedly more introspective tone than their previous album, and critics gave it mixed reviews. By this point Jethro Tull had been awarded six RIAA gold records for sales of Stand Up (1969), Aqualung (1971), Thick as a Brick (1972), Living in the Past (1972), A Passion Play (1973), and Minstrel in the Gallery (1975). For the 1975 tour, Dee Palmer, who had long been the band's orchestra arranger, officially joined the band's stage show on keyboards and synthesisers. In February 1975 Jethro Tull sold out five nights at the 20,000-seat Los Angeles Forum, prompting Melody Maker to run the headline "Jethro – Now The World's Biggest Band?" After the tour, bassist Hammond quit the band to pursue painting. John Glascock, who earlier was playing with flamenco-rock band Carmen, a support band on the previous Jethro Tull tour, became the band's new bassist.

1976's Too Old to Rock 'n' Roll: Too Young to Die! was another concept album, this time about the life of an ageing rocker. (On the live version of the album's title track released two years later, Anderson denies that the song is about himself.) Glascock made his first appearance on this album, contributing harmony and second vocals in addition to the bass lines. Palmer continued to arrange, and she recorded as a guest on two songs. For the 1976 tour, Jethro Tull became one of the first bands to use giant projection screens for the larger stadium shows. Although Too Old... did not sell as well as the other 1970s albums, the 1976 compilation M.U. - The Best of Jethro Tull, achieved Platinum Album in US and Gold record in UK. A television special was recorded showing the development of the album's concept in a live show with the band (fully dressed in the most rock-hard-tongue-in-cheek outfits), but the programme was never officially released.

Folk rock (1977–1979)

In the late 1970s, Jethro Tull released a trio of folk rock albums, Songs from the Wood (1977), Heavy Horses (1978), and Stormwatch (1979). Songs from the Wood (1977) was the first Tull album to receive generally positive reviews since the release of Living in the Past (1972). The Christmas/Winter Solstice-themed song "Ring Out, Solstice Bells" was released as an EP in the winter of 1976, just prior to Songs From the Wood, and became a moderate hit on the British charts. It went on to become a popular Christmas song in the UK and was rerecorded in 2003 for The Jethro Tull Christmas Album.

The band had long ties to folk rockers Steeleye Span (Tull were the backing band on Steeleye Span front woman Maddy Prior's 1978 solo album Woman in the Wings as a way of repaying her for contributing vocals on the Too Old to Rock 'n' Roll: Too Young to Die! album) and with Fairport Convention (Fairport members Dave Pegg, Martin Allcock, Dave Mattacks, and Ric Sanders have all played with Tull at one point or another, as well as folk drummer Gerry Conway who became a Fairport member after playing with Tull). Although not formally considered a part of the folk rock movement (which had actually begun nearly a decade earlier with the advent of Fairport Convention), there was clearly an exchange of musical ideas among Tull and the folk rockers. By this time, Anderson had moved to a farm in the countryside, and his new bucolic lifestyle was clearly reflected in his songwriting, as in the title track of Heavy Horses (1978), a paean to draught horses.

The band continued to tour, and released a live double album in 1978, titled Bursting Out, which was recorded during the European leg of the Heavy Horses tour. During the US leg of this tour in 1979, John Glascock suffered health problems and was replaced by Anderson's friend and former Stealers Wheel bassist, Tony Williams.

Their third folk influenced album, Stormwatch, was released in 1979.  During the making of the album, Glascock suffered major health issues related to open heart surgery from the previous year, so Anderson played bass on much of the album.  After the release of Stormwatch, due to Glascock's continued health issues, Fairport Convention bassist Dave Pegg was hired for the ensuing tour, during which Glascock died from heart complications at his home in England.

The "Big Split" and electronic rock (1980–1984)

Following the end of the Stormwatch tour in early 1980, Jethro Tull would undergo its largest line-up shuffle to date, resulting in Barlow, Evan, and Palmer leaving the band.  Different stories have been given over the years for the various reasons behind the band's restructuring, including that Barlow was depressed and withdrawn after Glascock's death and that Evan and Palmer found their futures in the band to be murky with Anderson's announcement that he wanted to work on a solo album. 
In the 2008 Classic Artists documentary Jethro Tull: Their Fully Authorised Story, Barlow claimed that he left the band on a mutual agreement with Anderson while Evan and Palmer both recalled being dismissed by a letter in the mail. 
Following their termination from Jethro Tull, Evan, and Palmer briefly collaborated in a classical-based pop/rock band called Tallis. Jethro Tull was left with Anderson (the only original member), Martin Barre, and Dave Pegg.

Tull's first album of the 1980s was intended to be Ian Anderson's first solo album. Anderson retained Barre on electric guitar and Pegg on bass, while adding Mark Craney on drums, and special guest keyboardist/violinist Eddie Jobson (ex–Roxy Music, Frank Zappa, Curved Air and U.K., the last of which had opened for several shows on Tull's Stormwatch tour). Highlighted by the prominent use of synthesisers, it contrasted sharply with the established "Tull sound".  After pressure from Chrysalis Records, Anderson agreed to release it as a Jethro Tull album. Entitled A (taken from the labels on the master tapes for his scrapped solo album, marked simply "A" for "Anderson"), it was released in mid-1980.

In keeping with the mood of innovation surrounding the album, Jethro Tull developed a music video titled Slipstream. Four staged and separately filmed music videos are mixed with concert footage from the A tour. London's Hammersmith Odeon was used for exterior scenes, but the main concert footage was actually from an American performance, at the Los Angeles Sports Arena (as heard on the Magic Piper ROIO), filmed in November 1980. The video, released in 1981, was directed by David Mallet, who has directed numerous music videos, including the pioneering "Ashes to Ashes" video for David Bowie.

Jobson and Craney returned to their own work following the A tour and Jethro Tull entered a period of revolving drummers: Gerry Conway, who left after deciding he could not be the one to replace Barlow, Phil Collins (as a fill-in for the recently departed Gerry Conway, played with the band at the first Prince's Trust concert in 1982), Paul Burgess (for the US leg of the Broadsword and the Beast tour, and who left to settle down with his family) and permanent drummer Doane Perry.

1981 was the first year in their career that the band did not release an album; however, some recording sessions took place (Anderson, Barre, Pegg, and Conway, with Anderson playing the keyboards). Some of these tracks were released on the Nightcap compilation in 1993.

In 1982, Peter-John Vettese joined on keyboards, and the band returned to a somewhat folkier sound—albeit with synthesisers—for 1982's The Broadsword and the Beast. The ensuing concert tour for the album was well attended and the shows featured what was to be one of the group's last indulgences in full-dress theatricality. The stage was built to resemble a Viking longship and the band performed in faux-medieval regalia.

An Anderson solo album, which was in fact a collaborative Anderson-Vettese effort, appeared in 1983, in the form of the heavily electronic Walk into Light.  As with later solo efforts by Anderson and Barre, some of the Walk into Light songs—such as "Fly by Night", "Made in England", and "Different Germany"—later made their way into Jethro Tull live sets.

In 1984, Jethro Tull released Under Wraps, a heavily electronic album with no "live" drummer and instead, as on Walk into Light, a drum-machine was used. Although the band were reportedly proud of the sound (Barre even considering it one of his personal favourites), the album was not well received.  However, the video for "Lap of Luxury" did manage to earn moderate rotation on the newly influential MTV music video channel.  As a result of the throat problems Anderson developed singing the demanding Under Wraps material on tour, Jethro Tull took a three-year break. Vettese quit the band after the tour, angry at critics for the bad reviews of The Broadsword and the Beast (1982), Walk into Light (1983), and Under Wraps (1984). During this hiatus, Anderson continued to oversee the salmon farm he had founded in 1978, although the single "Coronach" was released in the UK in 1986 after it was used as the theme tune for a Channel 4 television program called "Blood of the British".

Anderson, Barre, Pegg, and Perry: the "hard rock" Tull (1987–1994)
Jethro Tull returned in 1987 with Crest of a Knave. With Vettese absent (Anderson contributed the synth programming) and the band relying more heavily on Barre's electric guitar than they had since the early 1970s, the album was a critical and commercial success. Shades of their earlier electronic excursions were still present, however, as three of the album's songs again used a drum machine, with Doane Perry and Gerry Conway sharing drum duties on the other tracks. Prior to the Crest of a Knave tour, keyboardist Don Airey (ex-Rainbow, Ozzy Osbourne, Michael Schenker Group, Gary Moore, Colosseum II) joined the band.

The band won the 1989 Grammy Award for Best Hard Rock/Metal Performance Vocal or Instrumental, beating the favorite Metallica and their ...And Justice for All album. The award was particularly controversial as many did not consider Jethro Tull hard rock, much less heavy metal. On the advice of their manager, who told them they had no chance of winning, no one from the band attended the award ceremony. In response to the criticism they received over the award, their label, Chrysalis, took out an advertisement in a British music periodical with a picture of a flute lying amid a pile of iron and the line, "the flute is a heavy metal instrument", with the word "heavy" inserted into the sentence as though a later addition. In response to an interview question about the controversy, Ian Anderson quipped, "Well, we do sometimes play our mandolins very loudly." In 2007, the win was named one of the ten biggest upsets in Grammy history by Entertainment Weekly, and ranked #1 in EW's 2017 listing of Grammy upsets. In 1992, when Metallica finally won the Grammy in the category, Metallica drummer Lars Ulrich joked, "First thing we're going to do is thank Jethro Tull for not putting out an album this year," a play on a Grammy comment by Paul Simon some years before thanking Stevie Wonder for the same thing.

The style of Crest of a Knave (1987) has been compared to that of Dire Straits, in part because Anderson no longer seemed to have the vocal range he once possessed and preferred to use the lower registers, while Martin Barre's guitar sound apparently drifted towards Mark Knopfler's style. Two songs in particular—"Farm on the Freeway" and "Steel Monkey"—got heavy radio airplay. The album also contained the popular live song "Budapest", which depicts a backstage scene with a shy local female stagehand. Although "Budapest" was the longest song on that album (at just over ten minutes), "Mountain Men" became more famous in Europe, depicting a scene from World War II in Africa. Ian Anderson referred to the battles of El Alamein and the Falkland Islands, drawing historical parallels of the angst that women left behind by their warrior husbands might have felt: 

They toured this album with "The Not Quite the World, More the Here and There Tour". It was also the first time in the band's history that it had two electric guitar players on stage, when Anderson, albeit rarely, played rhythm guitar.

1988 was notable for the release of 20 Years of Jethro Tull, a five-LP themed set (also released as a three-CD set, and as a truncated single CD version on 20 Years of Jethro Tull: Highlights) consisting largely of rarities and outtakes from throughout the band's history, as well as a variety of live and remastered tracks. It also included a booklet outlining the band's history in detail. Now out of print, it has become a collector's item, although many (but not all) of the outtakes have been included as bonus tracks on remastered releases of the band's studio albums.

In 1989, the band released Rock Island, which met with less commercial and critical success than Crest of a Knave (1987). The lead-off track, "Kissing Willie", featured bawdy double-entendre lyrics and over-the-top heavy metal riffing that seemed to take a satiric view of the group's recent Grammy award win. The song's accompanying video found difficulty in receiving airplay because of its sexual imagery.  Although Rock Island was something of a miss for the group, a couple of fan favourites did emerge from the album. "Big Riff and Mando" reflects life on the road for the relentlessly touring musicians, giving a wry account of the theft of Barre's prized mandolin by a starstruck fan. "Another Christmas Song", an upbeat number celebrating the humanitarian spirit of the holiday season, stood out against the brooding and sombre mood of many of the songs on the album and was well received at concerts. It was re-recorded for the 2003 The Jethro Tull Christmas Album release.

1991's Catfish Rising was a more solid album than Rock Island (1989). Despite being labelled as a "return to playing the blues", the album actually is marked by the generous use of mandolin and acoustic guitar and much less use of keyboards than any Tull album of the '80s. Notable tracks included "Rocks on the Road", which highlighted gritty acoustic guitar work and hard-bitten lyrics about urban life, and "Still Loving You Tonight", a bluesy, low-key ballad.

Roots to Branches and J-Tull.com: the world music influences (1995–2000)

Following a further, semi-acoustic 1992 tour (which included Dave Mattacks but not Andy Giddings, and which was documented with A Little Light Music, the band's second official live album), Anderson relearned how to play the flute (after his daughter, who took up flute classes at school, discovered that her father often used the wrong fingering) and began writing songs that heavily featured world music influences. However, the first Tull releases containing the "relearned" flute were the 1993 25th Anniversary Box Set which, as well as the remixes of classic songs and unreleased live material, included a whole CD of old songs from the band's entire career recorded by the current line-up, and the 1993 Nightcap compilation album containing unreleased studio material (mainly from the scrapped pre-A Passion Play album), with multiple flute parts re-recorded.

During the recording of 1995's Roots to Branches album, longstanding bass player Dave Pegg decided to leave the band, wishing to concentrate on Fairport Convention and not being keen on the world-music direction the band had chosen. Pegg subsequently only contributed to three of the album's songs and played his last concerts in the UK up to the end of September 1995. Doane Perry (returning as the band's full-time drummer) recruited his friend and widely respected session bass player Steve Bailey to fill the gap. Ian Anderson, in turn, relinquished control of the rhythm section arrangements on that record, leaving them completely to Bailey and Perry. Despite his studio contributions, however, Bailey did not join the band, and Pegg's formal replacement as Jethro Tull bassist was Jonathan Noyce. Jonathan Noyce commenced his Jethro Tull membership with the European leg in October 1995. 

Roots to Branches (1995) and 1999's J-Tull Dot Com were less rock-based than Crest of a Knave (1987) or Catfish Rising (1991). Songs on these albums reflect the musical influences of decades of performing all around the globe. In songs such as "Out of the Noise" and "Hot Mango Flush", Anderson paints vivid pictures of third-world street scenes. These albums reflected Anderson's coming to grips with being an old rocker, with songs such as the pensive "Another Harry's Bar", "Wicked Windows" (a meditation on reading glasses), and the gruff "Wounded, Old and Treacherous".

Live albums, world tours, and The Jethro Tull Christmas Album (2001–2010)

In January 2002, the original lineup of the band (including Anderson, Abrahams, Cornick, and Bunker) reunited for a one-off pub performance in England that was filmed for inclusion in the Living with the Past DVD.  It was the first and only time the original four members had played together since 1968, as well as the only time a former Tull lineup has ever reunited.

2003 saw the release of The Jethro Tull Christmas Album, a collection of traditional Christmas songs together with old and new Christmas songs written by Jethro Tull. It would be the last studio album by the band for nearly 20 years. It became the band's biggest commercial success since the 1987 Crest of a Knave. An Ian Anderson live double album and DVD was released in 2005 called Ian Anderson Plays the Orchestral Jethro Tull. In addition, a DVD entitled Nothing Is Easy: Live at the Isle of Wight 1970 and a live album Aqualung Live (recorded in 2004) were released in 2005.

2006 saw the release of a dual boxed set DVD Collector's Edition, containing two DVDs—Nothing Is Easy: Live at the Isle of Wight 1970 and Living with the Past. Bassist Jon Noyce left the band in March 2006. Keyboardist Andrew Giddings quit the band in July 2006, citing constant touring allowing not enough time for family. They were replaced by David Goodier and John O'Hara. In the following year The Best of Acoustic Jethro Tull, a 24-song set of Tull's and Ian Anderson's acoustic performances taken from various albums, was released. Included were a new live acoustic version of "One Brown Mouse" and a live performance of the traditional song (attributed to Henry VIII), "Pastime with Good Company".

In September 2007, Jethro Tull released CD/DVD Live at Montreux 2003. The concert was recorded on 4 July 2003 and featured, among others, "Fat Man", "With You There to Help Me" and "Hunting Girl", with the longest unchanged line-up: Anderson, Barre, Perry, Noyce and Giddings.

In February 2010, the band were commemorated with a Heritage Award by PRS for Music. A plaque was erected on a Catholic church in Blackpool, where the band performed their first ever gig.

Anderson and Barre split & disbanding (2011–2017)
During interviews in November 2011, Martin Barre stated that there were no current plans for future Jethro Tull work. In 2012, Barre assembled and toured with a group, billed as Martin Barre's New Day; it included Jonathan Noyce and played mostly Tull material. In 2015, Barre stated "It's important that people realize there will never be a Jethro Tull again. There will be two solo bands: the Ian Anderson Band and the Martin Barre Band, and long may they exist, and long may they enjoy playing music. I'm not being pedantic. I always hate to hear, 'Oh, you've left Jethro Tull.' I haven't really. Ian wanted to finish Jethro Tull, wanted to stop the band completely."

On 30 January 2012, Anderson announced via the Jethro Tull website that Thick as a Brick 2: Whatever Happened to Gerald Bostock?, a followup to Thick as a Brick, would be released on 2 April 2012. It was recorded by Anderson and the Ian Anderson Touring Band. This line-up also performed on the following tour. The band included two former Jethro Tull members, bassist David Goodier and keyboardist John O'Hara, plus guitarist Florian Opahle, drummer Scott Hammond, and additional vocalist Ryan O'Donnell. Thick as a Brick 2 had its world premiere on 14 April 2012 at Perth Concert Hall, Scotland, kicking off an expected 18-month tour supporting both the original and new albums. 

In November 2013, Anderson announced via the Jethro Tull website that a new album Homo Erraticus ("The Wandering Man") would be released in April 2014. This was followed by tours in the UK and US, during which the album was played in its entirety. Homo Erraticus is a prog-rock concept album which, according to Anderson, "chronicles the weird imaginings of one Ernest T. Parritt, as recaptured by the now middle-aged Gerald Bostock after a trip to Mathew Bunter's Old Library Bookshop in Linwell village. Bostock and Bunter came across this dusty, unpublished manuscript, written by local amateur historian Ernest T. Parritt, (1873–1928), and entitled Homo Britanicus Erraticus." Like Thick as a Brick 2, Homo Erraticus is billed as an Ian Anderson solo album.

In an April 2014 interview, following the release of Anderson's solo album Homo Erraticus, Anderson announced that from that point on, he would be releasing all his music under his own name. Anderson stated that Jethro Tull "kind of came more or less to an end during the last 10 years or so," and stated his preference "in my twilight years, to use my own name for the most part being composer of virtually all Tull songs and music since 1968." In the liner notes Anderson explains that he will continue to operate under his own name.

2015 saw Anderson tour with the 'Ian Anderson Touring Band' and the project Jethro Tull – The Rock Opera; a lyrically modified Tull repertoire and new rock songs about the namesake of the band, Jethro Tull, together with elaborate video productions to the stage. The touring band included a female vocalist for the first time, Icelander Unnur Birna Björnsdóttir, who also plays the violin. The 2016 Tour visited Europe, Australia, and the US. In 2017, Anderson toured under the title "Jethro Tull by Ian Anderson".

Reformation, fiftieth anniversary tour, The Zealot Gene, and RökFlöte (2017–present)

In September 2017, Anderson announced plans for a tour to commemorate the fiftieth anniversary of This Was, and a new studio album in 2018. The band line-up included Anderson, Hammond, Opahle, O'Hara, and Goodier (all musicians of Anderson's solo band since 2012), with Barre absent from the lineup.

On 2 January 2018, Ian Anderson published a New Year post on jethrotull.com, including a picture of Anderson with the caption "IA in the studio working on a new album for release March 2019. Shhhh; keep it a secret..."

On 1 June 2018, Parlophone Records released a new (50-track) career collection celebrating the band's 50th anniversary featuring all 21 Tull albums, named 50 for 50. In the notes of the 50 for 50 booklet it is said that the new album scheduled for 2019 will be a solo record by Ian Anderson and not a new album by Jethro Tull.

In November 2019 "Ian Anderson and the Jethro Tull band" announced The Prog Years Tour with 11 dates across the UK in September and October 2020 but it was subsequently postponed due to the COVID-19 pandemic. Guitar duties would be handled by new member Joe Parrish, with Opahle leaving the band at the end of 2019 to focus on production work and his family.

In March 2021, Anderson announced the title of Jethro Tull's 22nd studio album, The Zealot Gene, making it the band's first studio album since 2003's The Jethro Tull Christmas Album, and the first one with all original, new material since 1999's J-Tull Dot Com.

In April 2021, on the occasion of the 50th Anniversary of the album, the official music video for "Aqualung" was premiered on Rolling Stone. The animated music video is directed by Iranian animator/director Sam Chegini. Ian Anderson praised Chegini in a statement to Rolling Stone, saying "At the suggestion of my pal, Jakko Jakszyk of King Crimson, I contacted a young Iranian videographer/director, Sam Chegini. He delivered a unique rendition of the 'Aqualung' song with abstract and documentary-type footage. A talented young man with a bright future in the music arts."

On 13 July 2021, it was announced that Jethro Tull had signed with Inside Out Music for the release of their 22nd album The Zealot Gene in early 2022. On 5 November 2021, the band announced on their official website that the album would be released on 28 January 2022.

On 17 November 2022, the band announced on their Facebook page that they had completed recording their 23rd studio album, which is expected to be released in spring 2023. On 20 January 2023, the title of the album was revealed to be RökFlöte, with a release date of 21 April 2023.

Legacy
Jethro Tull's influence on musicians includes Iron Maiden's Steve Harris and Bruce Dickinson, W.A.S.P.'s Blackie Lawless, Pearl Jam's Eddie Vedder, Dream Theater's John Myung, Blind Guardian's Marcus Siepen, Joe Bonamassa, the Decemberists' Jenny Conlee, and folk doom metal band Blood Ceremony. 

Rush's Geddy Lee said about Jethro Tull: "I was a massive Tull fan from very young ... and, I hope, that too reflects in Rush. I was mesmerised by Ian Anderson. His presentation was simply magical and he delivered it with such a sense of humour and great style ... We [of Rush] saw it as a huge challenge to try and create something that can seem so dynamic onstage."

Gentle Giant's Derek Shulman put Jethro Tull as one of the greatest bands in progressive rock history. After touring with the band in 1972, Shulman praised the band as musicians and friends. 

Nick Cave is a fan of Jethro Tull, having named one of his sons Jethro in honour of the group.  His group, Grinderman, also covered "Locomotive Breath" during soundchecks. At Cave's own request, Ian Anderson presented him with his Album of the Year trophy at the MOJO Awards in 2008.

Members

Current line-up
 Ian Anderson – vocals, flute, acoustic and electric guitar, other instruments (1967–2012, 2017–present)
 David Goodier – bass (2007–2012, 2017–present)
 John O'Hara – keyboards, accordion, vocals (2007–2012, 2017–present)
 Scott Hammond – drums (2017–present)
 Joe Parrish – electric and acoustic guitars, vocals (2020–present)

Previous musicians

 Mick Abrahams – guitar, vocals (1967–1968)
 Clive Bunker – drums, percussion (1967–1971)
 Glenn Cornick – bass guitar (1967–1970) (died 2014)
 Tony Iommi – guitar (1968)
 Martin Barre – electric and acoustic guitars, mandolin, lute, flute (1968–2012)
 John Evan – keyboards (1970–1980)
 Jeffrey Hammond – bass, vocals (1971–1975)
 Barriemore Barlow – drums, percussion (1971–1980)
 John Glascock – bass guitar, harmony and backing vocals (1975–1979) (died 1979)
 Dee Palmer – keyboards (1977–1980; also worked with the band as an arranger between 1967 and 1976)
 Dave Pegg – bass, mandolin, vocals (1979–1995)
 Mark Craney – drums (1980–1981) (died 2005)
 Gerry Conway – drums, percussion (1981–1982; studio – 1987–1988)
 Peter-John Vettese – keyboards, vocoder (1982–1986; studio – 1989)
 Doane Perry – drums, percussion, vocals (1984–2012)
 Maartin Allcock – keyboards, guitar, mandolin (1988–1991) (died 2018)
 Andrew Giddings – keyboards, accordion, bass (1991–2007)
 Jonathan Noyce – bass, percussion (1995–2007)
 Florian Opahle – electric and acoustic guitars (2017–2019)

Guest musicians
 David O'List – guitar (1968)
 Tony Williams– bass (1978)
 Eddie Jobson – keyboards, violin (1980–1981, 1985)
 Phil Collins – drums (1982)
 Paul Burgess – drums (1983)
 Don Airey – keyboards (1987)
 Matt Pegg – bass (1991, 1994)
 Scott Hunter – drums (1991)
 Dave Mattacks – drums, keyboards (1992)
 Mark Parnell – drums (1994)
 Steve Bailey – bass (1995)
 Lucia Micarelli – violin (2005–2006)
 Anna Phoebe – violin (2006–2007, 2009)
 Ann Marie Calhoun – violin (2006–2007)
 James Duncan Anderson – drums (2007–2009)
 Mark Mondesir – drums (2009)

Discography

Studio albums

This Was (1968)
Stand Up (1969)
Benefit (1970)
Aqualung (1971)
Thick as a Brick (1972)
A Passion Play (1973)
War Child (1974)
Minstrel in the Gallery (1975)
Too Old to Rock 'n' Roll: Too Young to Die! (1976)
Songs from the Wood (1977)
Heavy Horses (1978)
Stormwatch (1979)
A (1980)
The Broadsword and the Beast (1982)
Under Wraps (1984)
Crest of a Knave (1987)
Rock Island (1989)
Catfish Rising (1991)
Roots to Branches (1995)
J-Tull Dot Com (1999)
The Jethro Tull Christmas Album (2003)
The Zealot Gene (2022)
RökFlöte (2023)

References

Sources

External links

 
 Jethro Tull biography by Bruce Eder, discography and album reviews, credits & releases at AllMusic.com
 
 TullPress.com - over 300 full-text press articles and photos from 1968 to 2001

 
Island Records artists
Reprise Records artists
Chrysalis Records artists
Eagle Records artists
EMI Records artists
English progressive rock groups
English blues rock musical groups
English folk rock groups
English hard rock musical groups
Musical groups from Lancashire
Fontana Records artists
Grammy Award winners
Musical groups established in 1967
Musical groups disestablished in 2012
Musical groups reestablished in 2017
Philips Records artists
Articles which contain graphical timelines
1967 establishments in England
2012 disestablishments in England
2017 establishments in England